The Jalil Khayat Mosque is a Sunni Islamic mosque in Erbil, Kurdistan Region; the largest in the city. The mosque was begun by Jalil Khayat who died in 2005; and the mosque was completed in 2007 by his sons in memory of their father.

The mosque's style resembles the Mosque of Muhammad Ali in Cairo and the Blue mosque in Istanbul. It has been cited as one of the most beautiful mosque interiors. Alkhayat construction company states that 'The mosque building relies on Islamic architecture and al-Abbasi design except the domes', which are an Ottoman design.

See also

 Islam in Iraq
 List of mosques in Iraq
 Sorani

References

2007 establishments in Iraq
Mosques completed in 2007
Buildings and structures in Erbil
Abbasid architecture
Ottoman mosques in Iraq
Sunni mosques in Iraq